Christina Rupprecht (born 23 August 1992) is a German professional boxer who has held the WBC female mini-flyweight title since 2018. As an amateur she won multiple German national titles. As of May 2020, she is ranked as the world's third best active female mini-flyweight by BoxRec.

Amateur career
Two years prior to switching to boxing at the age of 14, Tina Rupprecht had joined her childhood boyfriend in kickboxing lessons. Competing for 1. Boxclub Haan Augsburg e.V., she won the 2009 and 2010 German amateur championships for juniors aged under 19 years in paper weight (up to 46 kg). Rupprecht participated in the 2010 European Youth & Junior Women's Championships, where, in her first tournament bout, she was defeated by the subsequent champion Maja Strömberg by 1:9 points. 2011 and 2012, she won the German championships in women's light flyweight. In addition, Rupprecht won the Bavarian championship in 2012, which she was able to repeat in 2013. After a dispute with the German Boxing Federation (Deutscher Boxsport-Verband), with a record of 30 wins, 5 losses and 1 draw, she switched to professional boxing.

Professional boxing career

With Rupprecht boxing in a weight class attracting only a small number of boxers, arranging fights with competitors on par is difficult. On 7 December 2013, she won her first professional bout at just 50 seconds into the first round by technical knockout. She defeated the opponents of her second and third boxing match in the bouts' first rounds as well. Winning against Spanish Joana Pastrana in October 2016, Rupprecht obtained the vacant WBC silver miniumweight title. In May 2017, she won the vacant IBO minimumweight inter-continental championship defeating Venezuelan Luisana Bolívar. Winning against French Anne Sophie Da Costa on 2 December 2017, Rupprecht obtained the title of WBC interim world champion becoming the mandatory challenger for the world championship. After reigning champion Momo Koseki retired from boxing in January 2018, Costa Rican Yokasta Valle was named Rupprecht's opponent for the world championship. Tina Rupprecht won the bout taking place in Munich on 16 June 2018 by unanimous decision, becoming WBC world champion.

Professional boxing record

References

External links 

 Official site
 

1992 births
Living people
Sportspeople from Augsburg
Mini-flyweight boxers
German women boxers
World Boxing Council champions